The Iglesia de Santo Toribio de Mogrovejo is a Catholic church located in the historic center of Cartagena de Indias, in Bolívar Department, Colombia, specifically in the northwestern corner of Plaza Fernández de Madrid, at the intersection of Calle Curato and Calle del Sargento Mayor, in Barrio San Diego. Its construction began in 1666, becoming the last church in the city to be built during the colonial period, and suspended at the stage of foundation construction, it was restarted in 1730 and completed in 1732. Due to its historical value, it was declared a national monument in 1995 along with other buildings in the city.

Among its relics, the main altarpiece is still preserved. Under the choir, the temple has a Mudéjar ceiling of indisputable Córdoban influence, as also happens with the alfarje (carved wood ceiling) and with the harneruelo (flat and central part of the coffered ceilings) of the main altar. Carpentry from Cartagena is beautifully represented in the two access doors to the sacristy, also the colonial font of Carrara marble in the sacristy is a masterpiece. In this also stand out the two artistic holy water fonts and the sink, pieces of alabaster elaborately carved, in the Sevillian Renaissance style.

Inside you can also see some mural paintings, which survived the lime cover; and the Baroque-style main altar, restored at the end of the 19th century and regilded in 1953 by master Emiliano Luque García.

Its advocation was Saint Turibius of Mogrovejo.

See also
List of colonial buildings in Cartagena, Colombia

References

Roman Catholic churches in Cartagena, Colombia
1666 establishments in the Spanish Empire
Roman Catholic churches completed in 1732
Spanish Colonial architecture in Colombia